Eremurus  is a genus of deciduous perennial flowers in the family Asphodelaceae. They are also known as the foxtail lilies or desert candles. They are native to eastern Europe in (Russia and Ukraine), and temperate Asia from Turkey to China.

The inflorescence consists of a tall floral spike whose individual flowers extend their anthers around the stem axis as in the bottle brushes. Depending on the species, the spike consists of many densely-arranged, small flowers in shades of orange, yellow, white, pale pink or red-orange. The grey-green, straplike leaves grow in a tuft from the succulent root crown. Eremurus is known for its thick, fingerlike roots, which grow from a central growth point. The blooming spike is notably tall and relatively narrow, rising from 3 to 9 or 10 feet above the foliage, depending on the variety. These plants are mainly native to western and central Asia, although Eremurus thiodanthus is endemic to the Crimea.

Cultivation 
Eremurus is hardy to USDA Zones 5-7. Usually four species are available commercially for cultivation:
E. robustus can reach  in height with pink or white flower spikes
E. stenophyllus, a dwarf species, reaches  in height with yellow flowers. 

Also E. ×  isabellinus which is a hybrid of E. olgae and E. stenophyllus is available as 'Cleopatra', with orange spikes.

The cultivar 'Joanna' has won the Royal Horticultural Society's Award of Garden Merit.  

The octopus-like tuberous roots are easily injured; planting on a cone of soil, with the crown on the peak and the roots hanging down, is recommended. Plants are readily affected by winter root rot, so that a layer of sand or gravel beneath is recommended to ensure drainage. Covering with compost or mulch provides protection from frost.

Species

Eremurus afghanicus Gilli - Afghanistan
 Eremurus aitchisonii Baker - Afghanistan, Pakistan, Kyrgyzstan, Tajikistan, Uzbekistan 
 Eremurus alaicus Khalk - Kyrgyzstan
 Eremurus albertii Regel - Afghanistan, Kyrgyzstan, Tajikistan, Uzbekistan 
 Eremurus × albocitrinus Baker - Iran (E. olgae × E. stenophyllus)
 Eremurus altaicus (Pall.) Steven - Altai Republic, Kazakhstan, Kyrgyzstan, Tajikistan, Uzbekistan, Xinjiang, Mongolia 
 Eremurus ammophilus Vved. - Uzbekistan 
 Eremurus anisopterus (Kar. & Kir.) Regel - Kazakhstan, Uzbekistan, Xinjiang
 Eremurus azerbajdzhanicus Kharkev. - Caucasus

 Eremurus bactrianus Wendelbo - Afghanistan
 Eremurus brachystemon Vved. - Tajikistan
 Eremurus bucharicus Regel - Afghanistan, Tajikistan
 Eremurus candidus Vved. - Tajikistan
 Eremurus cappadocicus J.Gay ex Baker - Turkey, Iraq, Syria
 Eremurus chinensis O.Fedtsch. - Gansu, Sichuan, Tibet, Yunnan
 †Eremurus chloranthus Popov - Uzbekistan but extinct
 Eremurus comosus O.Fedtsch. - Afghanistan, Kyrgyzstan, Tajikistan
 Eremurus cristatus Vved. - Kazakhstan, Kyrgyzstan
 Eremurus czatkalicus Lazkov - Kyrgyzstan
 Eremurus dolichomischus Vved. & Wendelbo - Afghanistan, Pakistan
 Eremurus furseorum Wendelbo - Afghanistan
 Eremurus fuscus (O.Fedtsch.) Vved - Kazakhstan, Kyrgyzstan, Pakistan, Tajikistan
 Eremurus hilariae Popov & Vved. - Kazakhstan, Kyrgyzstan, Tajikistan, Uzbekistan
 Eremurus himalaicus Baker -  Himalayas of Afghanistan + Pakistan + Kashmir
 Eremurus hissaricus Vved - Gissar Range in Tajikistan + Uzbekistan
 Eremurus iae Vved. - Tajikistan, Uzbekistan
 Eremurus inderiensis (M.Bieb.) Regel - European Russia, Western Siberia, Central Asia, Iran, Pakistan, Afghanistan, Xinjiang, Mongolia
 Eremurus × isabellinus P. L. Vilm. (E. stenophyllus × E. olgae) - Garden origin
 Eremurus jungei Juz. - Crimea
Eremurus kaufmannii Regel - Afghanistan, Kyrgyzstan, Tajikistan, Uzbekistan
 Eremurus kopet-daghensis Karrer - Turkmenistan, Iran
 Eremurus korovinii B.Fedtsch. - Kazakhstan, Tajikistan, Uzbekistan
 Eremurus korshinskyi O.Fedtsch - Afghanistan, Tajikistan
 Eremurus lachnostegius Vved. - Tajikistan
 Eremurus lactiflorus O.Fedtsch. - Kazakhstan, Kyrgyzstan, Uzbekistan
 Eremurus × ludmillae Levichev & Priszter - Uzbekistan (E. regelii × E. turkestanicus)
 Eremurus luteus Baker - Turkmenistan, Iran, Afghanistan, Tajikistan, Uzbekistan
 Eremurus micranthus Vved. - Tajikistan
 Eremurus nuratavicus Khokhr. Uzbekistan
 Eremurus olgae Regel - a dwarf species flowering in June or July, making it one of the last species to flower - Turkmenistan, Iran, Afghanistan, Tajikistan, Uzbekistan, Kyrgyzstan
 Eremurus parviflorus Regel - Pamir Mountains in Tajikistan
 Eremurus persicus (Jaub. & Spach) Boiss. - Iran, Afghanistan, Pakistan, Kashmir
 Eremurus pubescens Vved. - Tajikistan
 Eremurus rechingeri Wendelbo - Iraq
 Eremurus regelii Vved. - Tajikistan, Uzbekistan, Kyrgyzstan, Kazakhstan
 Eremurus robustus (Regel) Regel - Tajikistan, Uzbekistan, Kyrgyzstan, Kazakhstan -  grows from 6 to 10 feet high.
 Eremurus roseolus Vved - Afghanistan, Tajikistan
 Eremurus saprjagajevii B.Fedtsch. - Tajikistan, Uzbekistan
 Eremurus soogdianus (Regel) Benth. & Hook.f. - Tajikistan, Uzbekistan, Kyrgyzstan, Kazakhstan, Afghanistan
 Eremurus spectabilis M.Bieb. - European Russia, Ukraine, Caucasus, Iran, Iraq, Turkey, Syria, Lebanon, Israel, Palestine, Jordan, Turkmenistan 
 Eremurus stenophyllus (Boiss. & Buhse) Baker syn. E. bungei - Tajikistan, Uzbekistan, Kyrgyzstan, Iran, Afghanistan, Pakistan
 Eremurus subalbiflorus Vved. - Turkmenistan, Iran
 Eremurus suworowii Regel - Afghanistan, Tajikistan, Uzbekistan
 Eremurus tadshikorum Vved. - Tajikistan
 Eremurus tauricus Steven - Crimea, northern Caucasus in Russia
 Eremurus thiodanthus Juz. - Crimea
 Eremurus tianschanicus Pazij & Vved. ex Pavlov - Tajikistan, Kyrgyzstan, Kazakhstan
 Eremurus turkestanicus Regel - Tajikistan, Uzbekistan, Kyrgyzstan, Kazakhstan
 Eremurus wallii Rech.f. - Syria
 Eremurus zangezuricus Mikheev - southern Caucasus
 Eremurus zenaidae Vved. - Tajikistan, Uzbekistan, Kyrgyzstan
 Eremurus zoae Vved. - Kyrgyzstan*

References

Bibliography 

 
 
 

Asphodelaceae genera
Asphodeloideae